
The  is an infrequent professional wrestling tournament promoted by New Japan Pro-Wrestling (NJPW) as a means of showcasing the younger talent on their roster. The tournament is the successor to the Karl Gotch Cup that NJPW promoted in the 1970s. NJPW has held the tournament eleven times since 1985. After the 2005 tournament, NJPW did not hold another Young Lion Cup for 12 years, until reviving the tournament in 2017 and again in 2019.

The Young Lion Cup is a round-robin tournament in the same style as NJPW's annual G1 Climax tournament. Wrestlers traditionally earn two points for a victory, one point for any sort of draw and zero points for a loss. In some years, the two wrestlers with the most points at the end of the round-robin tournament would then face off in a singles match for the Young Lion Cup trophy, while in other years, the wrestler with the most points would be declared the winner. The winners of the Young Lion Cup would also be rewarded with a learning excursion overseas.

In 2020, another tournament featuring young lions, Lion's Break Crown, was organized by NJPW, this time as a single-elimination tournament.

Winners

1985

1986

1987

1989

1993

1994
The 1994 Young Lion Cup featured a league with at least four wrestlers, although more may have participated. The four confirmed participants were Satoshi Kojima, Manabu Nakanishi, Nobukazu Hirai from WAR, and Tatsuhito Takaiwa. The league scores remain unclear but Kojima and Nakanishi qualified for the finals where Kojima defeated Nakanishi by submission.

1995
The 1995 Young Lion Cup featured a league with at least six participants, although more may have participated. The confirmed participants were Manabu Nakanishi, Yuji Nagata, Yuki Ishikawa from Pro Wrestling Fujiwara Gumi, Tokimitsu Ishizawa, Tatsuhito Takaiwa, and Shinjiro Otani. The final league scores remain unclear but Nakanishi and Nagata both qualified for the final match, this was the second time Nakanishi had made it to the main event. In the finals Nakanishi defeated Nagata to claim the Young Lion Cup trophy.

1996
Tokimitsu Ishizawa defeated Yuji Nagata by pinfall (12:27)

2000
NJPW brought back the Young Lion Cup in 2000 with a round-robin tournament that took place between April 14 and May 5, 2000 during NJPW's "Strong Energy II 2000" tour. The tournament featured five rookies from NJPW, Shinya Makabe, Kenzo Suzuki, Wataru Inoue, Katsuyori Shibata and Hiroshi Tanahashi as well as Masakazu Fukuda from the G-EGGS promotion. The tournament was marred by a tragedy on the first night when Masakazu Fukuda was hurt by a flying elbow smash from Shibata. Following the blow he collapsed on the mat and was taken to the hospital. He died five days later from an internal brain hemorrhage. The rest of the tournament was dedicated to Fukuda's memory. Both Shinya Makabe and Kenzo Suzuki remained undefeated after the first four rounds, qualifying them for the final before they had even wrestled the final match of the league. On April 30, 2000 Makabe defeated Suzuki, making him the only undefeated wrestler in the tournament. On May 5, 2000, during Wrestling Dontaku 2000, Kenzo Suzuki defeated Makabe to win the 2000 Young Lion Cup.

2004
Ryusuke Taguchi defeated Kazuya Yuasa by pinfall (11:20).

2005
The 2005 Young Lion Cup was the tenth tournament held by NJPW and ran from to March 3 to March 23, 2005. The league matches took place during NJPW's "Big Fight Series 2005" tour and the final was on their NJPW "Nexess V" show. The tournament was scheduled to feature seven wrestlers but Tommy Williams was injured and had to withdraw from the competition without wrestling a single match, forfeiting all matches. The tournament also featured Naofumi Yamamoto, Yujiro, Hiroshi Nagao and Akiya Anzawa, in addition to the top two point scores Hirooki Goto (9 points) and Hiroyuki Ito (11 points). In the league Ito wrestled to a draw against Goto and won the other five matches, making him the only undefeated participant. On March 23, 2005, Hirooki Goto defeated Hiroyuki Ito to win the 2005 Young Lion Cup.

2017
After his match at the Lion's Gate Project 7 event on July 4, 2017, Yuji Nagata proposed bringing back the Young Lion Cup. On September 26, NJPW officially announced the revival of the tournament after 12 years. The round-robin tournament started on October 12 at Lion's Gate Project 8 and concluded on December 21 at Lion's Gate Project 10, and included six wrestlers who debuted in 2016 and 2017. The tournament was dedicated to the memory of Kotetsu Yamamoto, who served as the head of the NJPW Dojo.

2019

The 2019 Young Lion Cup was announced on August 27 and was held on the Destruction tour throughout September. It featured 8 participants: 4 from the New Japan Dojo, 3 from the Los Angeles Dojo, and 1 from the Fale Dojo. 2 competitors also competed in the 2017 tournament. Karl Fredericks won with 12 points.

References

New Japan Pro-Wrestling tournaments